This is a list of museums in Eritrea.

Museums
 National Museum of Eritrea
 Northern Red Sea Regional Museum
 Southern Red Sea National Museum

See also
 List of museums

References
 Museums in Eritrea

External links
 Museums in Eritrea

 
Eritrea
Museums
Museums
Eritrea

Museums